Balsby is a locality situated in Kristianstad Municipality, Skåne County, Sweden with 430 inhabitants in 2010.

References 

Populated places in Kristianstad Municipality
Populated places in Skåne County